The Chojna County was a county centered around the towns of Chojna and Dębno, that existed from 1945 to 1975. From 1945 to 1946, it was located in the District of the Western Pomerania, and from 1946 to 1975, in the Szczecin Voivodeship. Its seat was located in the towns of Dębno, and briefly in 1945, Chojna. In 1946, it had 19 537 inhabitants, and an area of 1374 km². Currently, its former area is under the administration of the counties of Gryfino and Myślibórz, located in West Pomeranian Voivodeship, Poland.

History 
The area used to be under the administration of the Königsberg Neumark District, Germany. It had been captured by the Red Army of the Soviet Union in 1945, during the Vistula–Oder offensive, between January and February 1945. Following that, it was given under the administration of the Provisional Government of the Republic of Poland, which established the Chojna County within the District of the Western Pomerania. Its seat was set in the town of Chojna, however due to the devastation of the city during the conflict, it was moved to the town of Dębno on 7 July 1945. Its original German population was subjected to the expulsion, and the area was resettled with Polish population, with the county being reserved for members of the military and their families. In 1946, it had 19 537 inhabitants, and an area of 1374 km².

The District of the Western Pomerania was disestablished on 28 June 1946, and replaced by the Szczecin Voivodeship. On 28 June 1945, the Provisional Government of the Republic of Poland was replaced by the Provisional Government of National Unity, which then was replaced by the Polish People's Republic on 19 February 1947. The county existed until 1 June 1975, when it was abolished due to the new administrative reform, with its territory was participated between then-established Szczecin and Gorzów Voivodeship.

Currently, its former area is under the administration of the counties of Gryfino and Myślibórz, located in West Pomeranian Voivodeship, Poland.

Citations

Notes

References 

Former counties of Poland
History of Pomerania
States and territories established in 1945
States and territories disestablished in 1975
1945 establishments in Poland
1975 disestablishments in Poland
Myślibórz County
Gryfino County